Anthony Martin Grosvenor Christopher, Baron Christopher CBE FRSA (born 25 April 1925) is a British businessman, trade unionist, tax official, and life peer.

Early life
The son of George and Helen Christopher, he was educated at Cheltenham Grammar School and at the Westminster College of Commerce. Between 1941 and 1944, Christopher worked first as articled pupil then as agricultural valuers in Gloucester. From 1944 to 1948, he served in the Royal Air Force and from 1948 to 1957, he worked for the Inland Revenue, leaving to work full-time for the Inland Revenue Staff Federation.

Trade union career
Between 1976 and 1988, Christopher was general secretary of the Inland Revenue Staff Federation. Since 1981, he is director of the TU Fund Managers Ltd and since 1983 its chairman. Also since 1983, he is elected auditor of the International Confederation of Free Trade Unions and since 1988, he worked as Industrial and Public Affairs Consultant.

Christopher worked for NACRO from 1956 to 1998, from 1956 as member of council and from 1973 as chairman. He was member of the TUC General Council from 1976 to 1989 and its chairman in 1988 and 1989. For the Civil Service Building Society, he was director between 1958 and 1987, as well as chairman between 1978 and 1987. He was member of the Inner London Probation and After-care Committee from 1966 to 1979, of the Tax Reform Committee from 1974 to 1980 and of the Royal Commission on Distribution of Income and Wealth in 1978 and 1979. Christopher was also member of the Independent Broadcasting Authority from 1978 to 1983, of the council of the Institute of Manpower Studies from 1984 to 1989 and of the Economic and Social Research Council from 1985 to 1988. Between 1983 and 1986, he was chairman of the Tyre Industry Economic Development Council and between 1985 and 1990 vice-president of the Building Societies Association. In 1987 and 1988, he was director of the Birmingham Midshires Building Society. Christopher was further member of the General Medical Council (GMC) from 1989 to 1994, of the Audit Commission from 1989 to 1995 and of the Broadcasting Complaints Commission from 1989 to 1997.

Christopher was trustee of the Commonwealth Trades Union Council Charitable Trust from 1985 to 1989 and of the Save The Children Fund from 1985 to 1990. For the Institute for Public Policy Research, he was trustee from 1989 to 1994 and treasurer from 1990 to 1994. Since 1981, Christopher is also trustee of the Trades Union Unit Trust Charitable Trust and since 1998 of the Douglas Houghton Memorial Fund.

Honours
In the 1984 New Year Honours, he was appointed a Commander of the Order of the British Empire (CBE) and in 1989 a Fellow of the Royal Society of Arts (FRSA). On 30 July 1998, he was created a life peer as Baron Christopher, of Leckhampton in the County of Gloucestershire, taking the Labour whip. Following the death of Lord Carrington in July 2018, Christopher became the oldest sitting member of the House of Lords. In March 2021, he took a leave of absence from the House of Lords. 

Since 1962, he has been married to Adela Joy Thompson.

Works
Policy for Poverty (1970)
The Wealth Report (1979)
The Wealth Report 2 (1982)

References

1925 births
Commanders of the Order of the British Empire
Labour Party (UK) life peers 
General secretaries of the Inland Revenue Staff Federation
Living people
People educated at Pate's Grammar School
Royal Air Force personnel of World War II
Members of the General Council of the Trades Union Congress
Presidents of the Trades Union Congress
Life peers created by Elizabeth II